The 2019 Judo Grand Slam Paris was held in Paris, France, from 9 to 10 February 2019.

Medal summary

Men's events

Women's events

Source Results

Medal table

References

External links
 

2019 IJF World Tour
2019 Judo Grand Slam
Judo
Grand Slam Paris 2019
Judo
Judo